Hsu Seu-Cheng or Xu Shuzheng (11 November 1880 – 29 December 1925) was a Chinese warlord in Republican China.  A subordinate and right-hand man of Duan Qirui, he was a prominent member of the Anhui clique.

Early life 
Xu was born in Xiao County, Jiangsu (now part of Anhui province), with a scholar family background. He was one of the youngest persons ever to pass the Imperial examinations. In 1905 he was accepted into the Japanese School of Land Army Officials, and returned to China in 1910. From 1911 to 1917 he served in the First Army in various positions on the general staff, such as chief of the Logistics Department, deputy chief of land forces and chief of land forces. In 1914 he founded a middle school called Cheng Da Middle School, which is the predecessor of today's Affiliated High School of the Capital Normal College.

In 1918 Xu founded the Anfu Club, the political arm of the Anhui clique, which then won three-fourths of the seats in the National Assembly. Later that year Xu executed Lu Jianzhang after discovering that Lu was trying to persuade Feng Yuxiang, Lu's nephew, to fight against the Anhui clique. This would lead to Xu's own assassination in 1925.

Military career 

In 1919 Xu assumed command of the Northwest Frontier Defense Army, which invaded newly independent Outer Mongolia in October. On November 17 he forced Outer Mongolia to withdraw its declaration of autonomy, thus temporarily bringing Mongolia back under Chinese control. In 1920, after Duan fell from power, Xu lost his position and moved his forces back to confront his enemies. He was replaced in Mongolia by Chen Yi, and Mongolia became independent again in early 1921 when Chinese forces were defeated by the Russian–Mongol army commanded by General Baron Roman von Ungern-Sternberg. Xu's forces were defeated in the subsequent Zhili–Anhui War and he was forced to take shelter in the Japanese embassy.

In the early 1920s, Xu was sent to Italy as part of a Chinese diplomatic mission; a secondary purpose was to get him out of the country. He returned to China in 1924 after Duan's return as chief executive.

Death 
In December 1925, while traveling from Beijing to Shanghai by train, Xu was kidnapped by Zhang Zhijiang, a member of Feng Yuxiang's forces. He was assassinated at dawn the next day by Feng as revenge for the killing of Lu Jianzhang. This also deprived Feng's rival Duan of a powerful supporter. Xu was 45 years old.

Personal life 

Xu had one wife and four concubines. His wife Xia Hongjun (also named Xia Xuan), died in Suzhou, Jiangxu Province, in 1955. They had four sons and two daughters. First son Hsu Shen-chiao ( Xu Shenjiao) and third son Hsu Dau-lin (Xu Daolin) were active in Republic of China politics. Hsu Dau-lin wrote a biography, published in Chinese in 1962, entitled The Life of General Hsu Shu-tseng.  Older daughter Hsu Ying Li ( Xu Ying, also named Xu Yinghuan), wrote a biography of her mother and married the linguist Fang-Kuei Li. The other three died in childhood.

The four concubines were Shen Dinglan, Shen Shupei (younger sister of Shen Dinglan), Wang Huicheng and Ping Fangchun. Xu had two daughters (Xu Pei and Xu Lan) with Shen Shupei, and two daughters (Xu Mei and Xu Hui) with Wang Huicheng.

Awards and decorations 
 Order of Rank and Merit (China)
 Order of the Precious Brilliant Golden Grain (China)
 Order of Wen-Hu (China)
 Order of the Sacred Treasure (Japan)

Sources
 陈贤庆 (Chen Xianqing), 民国军阀派系谈 (The Republic of China Warlord Cliques Discussed), 2007 revised edition
 Edward A. McCord,  The Power of the Gun: the Emergence of Modern Chinese Warlordism, Berkeley, University of California Press, 1993
 Arthur Waldron,  From War to Nationalism, Cambridge, Cambridge University Press, 1995

See also
List of warlords and military cliques in the Warlord Era
History of the Republic of China

References

1880 births
1925 deaths
Republic of China warlords from Anhui
Politicians from Suzhou, Anhui
Members of the Anhui clique